Justino Hernández Hilaria (born 14 April 1955) is a Mexican politician from the Institutional Revolutionary Party. From 2000 to 2003 he served as Deputy of the LVIII Legislature of the Mexican Congress representing San Luis Potosí. He previously served as municipal president of Tamazunchale from 1991 to 1994 and as a local deputy in the LV Legislature of the Congress of San Luis Potosí.

References

1955 births
Living people
Institutional Revolutionary Party politicians
20th-century Mexican politicians
21st-century Mexican politicians
Deputies of the LVIII Legislature of Mexico
Members of the Chamber of Deputies (Mexico) for San Luis Potosí
Members of the Congress of San Luis Potosí
Municipal presidents in San Luis Potosí
Politicians from San Luis Potosí
People from Tamazunchale